Angustific acid A and angustific acid B are antiviral compounds isolated from Kadsura angustifolia.  They are triterpenoids.

See also
 Angustifodilactone
 Neokadsuranin

References

Antiviral drugs
Cyclopropanes
Propionic acids
Oxygen heterocycles
Heterocyclic compounds with 4 rings
Heterocyclic compounds with 5 rings